Claire Polin (January 1, 1926 in Philadelphia, Pennsylvania – December 6, 1995 in Merion, Pennsylvania) was an American composer of contemporary classical music, musicologist, and flutist.

Education
She obtained degrees in music (including a doctorate) from the Philadelphia Conservatory; she also received her Master's Degree at the Juilliard School and her doctorate at Tanglewood.  Her teachers included Vincent Persichetti, Lukas Foss, Roger Sessions, and Peter Mennin.  She also studied flute with William Kincaid, with whom she collaborated on a multi-volume method of flute technique.

Career
Her works were commissioned and performed by the Seoul National Symphony Orchestra, the New York Philharmonia, the Israel Bach Society, and the London Pro Musica Antiqua of Westminster, as well as by William Kincaid, Gordon Gottlieb, and the Gregg Smith Singers.

Polin served on the faculty at Rutgers University, where she taught composition, as well as courses in the music of the Bible, music of ancient Wales, and music of Russia.  She also published books on musicological subjects.

Personal life
She is survived by two sons, Josef and Gabriel Schaff, and one grandchild.

List of works
Note: This is not a complete list. In some cases, the dates listed may have been the original publication date as opposed to the year it was written. Many pieces were published several times in new editions.

Compositions
 Sonata No. 1 for Flute 1959
 Symphony in two movements 1960
 No-Rai: Songs from Korea, 1963? Soprano Voice, Flute, Double Bass
 Sonata for Flute and Harp 1964/73
 No Man is an Island, SATB chorus, piano, 196_
 Serpentine: Lyrical instances for solo viola and imaginary dancer, 1965
 Structures for Solo Flute 1965
 Consecutivo: Study on a Requiem, 1966
 Summer Settings, harp, 1967
 Makimono, flute, clarinet, violin, violoncello, piano, 1969
 Second Sonata for flute and harp (From the Painter’s Brush), 197x
 Music for the Prince of Wales: Hen ganiadau gwanwyn, medium high voice (male or female) with cello accompaniment
 Cader Idris: Landscape for Brass Quintet, 1971
 Infinito: A Requiem, alto sax, soprano solo, narrator, SATB chorus, 1972
 Out of childhood; variations on Russian-Turkish folksongs for piano, 1972
 Margóä for solo flute, 1972
 O, Aderyn Pur, Flute, Alto Sax, Tape, or flute solo 1972
 The Death of Procris: Studies After a Painting by Piero di Cosimo, 1972-73 Flute and Tuba
 Telemannicon: Solo obe flute, canonically played with tape or live, 1974
 Second Symphony, 1974
 Journey of Owain Madoc: Symphonic Meditations on the Discovery of America, 1974
 Scenes from Gilgamesh, flute and string orchestra, 1974
 Makimono II: for brass quintet, 1975
 Laissez sonner for solo piano, 1976
 Pièce d’encore: for solo viola (or violin), 1976
 Synaulia II, flute(alto fl), clar(bass clar), piano, 1976
 Paraselene: Dark nebulae I: Book of Songs for Soprano, Flute, and Piano, 1976/77
 A klockwork diurnal, alto sax, French horn, bassoon, 1977
 Amphion: for symphony orchestra, 1977
 Wind Songs for soprano and guitar, 1978?
 Vigniatures: Variations for Violin and Harp, 1979
 Felína, Felína, violin, harp, 1980
 Res naturae: The Carmarthan dove in a mialiseet dance, woodwind quintet, 1980
 Dark nebulae II: Ma’a lot, viola and percussion, 1981
 Georgics: After Virgil for Solo Flute, 1981
 Mythos: Concerto for Harp and String Orchestra, 1982
 Kuequenaku-Cambiola, percussion and piano, 1983
 Phantasmagoria, piano 4 hands, 1985
 Freltic Sonata for Violin and Piano, 1985
 Shirildang: trans-Ural Suite for piano, 1991
 Walum olum, clarinet, viola, piano

Publications
 Music of the ancient Near East, 1974 Greenwood Press (Westport, CT)
 "Why Minimalism Now?" Music and the Politics of Culture, ed. Christopher Norris, pp. 226–239, London: Lawrence & Wishart 1989
 "Interviews with Soviet Composers", Tempo 1984 151, 10-16 Cambridge University Press
“The Composer as Seer, but not Prophet” Tempo Combridge 1994 Issue 190, p13-18
New York: Women in Music and Soviet Contemporaries. Tempo 174, 1990 p32,34,36-37
The Ap Huw manuscript. 1982 Henryville, PA: Institute of Mediaeval Musicological Studies. (Vol 34?)
“Observations on the Ap Huw manuscript. Music & Letters 60(3) 1979, 296-304: Oxford University Press.
A Possible Provenance for parts of the Ap Huw manuscript. Welsh Music, 1985.
The Ap Huw Manuscript. Music & Letters 62(1): 120, 1981
Moscow Festival Diary. Tempo 1984 No. 150 p. 35-38
Ancient Semitic Music: A study starting in earliest times and ending circa 500 BC (1950)
 A Treasury of Jewish Folksong. Ethnomusicology 9(2). 191-193 (1965)
 Gifts of Jubal; musical instruments from the ancient East. Philadelphia, PA: University Museum Press

References

External links 
 Claire Polin biography

1926 births
1995 deaths
20th-century classical composers
American women classical composers
American classical composers
People from Lycoming County, Pennsylvania
Pupils of Roger Sessions
Pupils of Vincent Persichetti
University of the Arts (Philadelphia) alumni
Women flautists
20th-century American women musicians
20th-century American composers
20th-century women composers
20th-century flautists